The 2010–11 Maltese Second Division started in September 2010 and will end in May 2011. St. Patrick and San Gwann were relegated from the 2009–10 Maltese First Division. Zejtun Corinthians, Mgarr United and Naxxar Lions were promoted from 2009–10 Maltese Third Division.

Participating teams
 Birzebbuga St.Peters
 Gzira United
 Mellieha
 Mgarr United
 Naxxar Lions
 Rabat Ajax
 San Gwann
 Senglea Athletic
 St. Patrick
 Zebbug Rangers
 Zejtun Corinthians
 Zurrieq

Changes from previous season
 Lija Athletic and St. Andrews were promoted to 2010–11 Maltese First Division. They were replaced with St. Patrick and San Gwann, both relegated from 2009–10 Maltese First Division
 Santa Venera Lightning, Gharghur and Gozo FC were relegated to 2010–11 Maltese Third Division. They were replaced with Zejtun Corinthians, Mgarr United and Naxxar Lions, all promoted from the 2009–10 Maltese Third Division.

Final league table

Decider for promotion to Maltese First Division 2011-12

A Decider was needed between  St. Patrick and Mellieha because they both ended with 36 points. Therefore, a Promotion decider for the Maltese First Division. The game was won by St. Patrick in the final minutes of the game. Glenn Barry Scored the only Goal.

Top scorers

Results

External links
 http://www.maltafootball.com/archives/2010-11/second.shtml
 http://www.maltafootball.com/archives/2010-11/tables/second/tableoverall.php
 http://www.maltafootball.com/2011/05/09/bov-division-2-st-patrick-win-promotion/

Maltese Second Division seasons
Malta
3